= Medial section =

Medial section may refer to:

- The golden ratio
- Structures close to the centre of an organism, see: anatomical terms of location#Medial and lateral
